The 1924–25 international cricket season was from September 1924 to April 1925.

Season overview

December

England in Australia

March

Victoria in New Zealand

References

International cricket competitions by season
1924 in cricket
1925 in cricket